The Great Salt Pond is the largest lake within Saint Kitts and Nevis, a country in the Lesser Antilles archipelago of the Caribbean.

Geography
It is located on Saint Kitts island, near the point of the Southeast Peninsula and to the north of The Narrows isthmus. St. Anthony's Peak overlooks it.

Ecology
It is a wildlife habitat for: birds, such as the common gallinule; invertebrates; and fish, including as an estuary nursery area for Caribbean Sea dwelling fish.

See also

References

Bodies of water of Saint Kitts and Nevis
Saint Kitts (island)
Lakes of the Caribbean